Old Fire House is a historic fire station located at Milford, Kent County, Delaware.  It was built in 1925 as a combination fire house for the Carlisle Fire Company and community center. It is a two-story, square brick building with a projecting two-story entrance wing and stair tower.  It has a flat roof and cornice capped with pre-cast concrete blocks.

It was listed on the National Register of Historic Places in 1983.

References 

Fire stations completed in 1925
Fire stations on the National Register of Historic Places in Delaware
National Register of Historic Places in Kent County, Delaware
Buildings and structures in Milford, Delaware
1925 establishments in Delaware
Community centers in the United States